Tiina Mälberg (born 16 March 1970) is an Estonian actress.

Tiina Mälberg was born and raised in Tallinn. She graduated from Saku Secondary School in 1988, then enrolled at the Tallinn State Conservatory, studying under instruction of theatre and film director Kalju Komissarov, and graduating in 1992. Among her graduating classmates were: Merle Palmiste, Kristel Leesmend, Andres Raag, Kaili Närep, Dan Põldroos, Jaanus Rohumaa, Üllar Saaremäe, Ivo Uukkivi, Sten Zupping, and Garmen Tabor.

In 2006, she received a master's degree in theatre from the Estonian Academy of Music and Theatre. From 2003 until 2004, she taught theatre courses at the Rakvere Private Gymnasium. Since 2011, Mälberg has been a theatre lecturer  at the Viljandi Culture Academy of the University of Tartu.

From 1991 until 1997, she worked at Ugala theatre in Viljandi. Since 1997, she has been engaged at the Rakvere Theatre. Besides theatrical roles, she has also worked as a radio, television, and film actress.

Selected filmography

 2005 August 1991 (role: Virve Liivanõmm)
 2006 Kelgukoerad 
 2011 Kalevipojad 
 2012 Kättemaksukontor (role: Inge Peeker)
 2014-2016 Viimane võmm (role: Laura Kotkas)
 2016 Ema ('Mother') (role: Mother)
 2017 Mehetapja/Süütu/Vari (role: Guardian)

References

Living people
1970 births
Estonian stage actresses
Estonian film actresses
Estonian television actresses
Estonian radio actresses
20th-century Estonian actresses
21st-century Estonian actresses
Estonian educators
Estonian Academy of Music and Theatre alumni
Academic staff of the Estonian Academy of Music and Theatre
Actresses from Tallinn